

Events

Pre-1600
 410 – The sacking of Rome by the Visigoths ends after three days.
1172 – Henry the Young King and Margaret of France are crowned junior king and queen of England.
1232 – Shikken Hojo Yasutoki of the Kamakura shogunate promulgates the Goseibai Shikimoku, the first Japanese legal code governing the samurai class.
1557 – The Battle of St. Quentin results in Emmanuel Philibert becoming Duke of Savoy.
1593 – Pierre Barrière failed an attempt to assassinate Henry IV of France.
1597 – Jeongyu War: Battle of Chilcheollyang: A Japanese fleet of 500 ships decimates Joseon commander Won Gyun’s fleet of 200 ships at Chilcheollyang.
1600 – Ishida Mitsunari’s Western Army commences the Siege of Fushimi Castle, which is lightly defended by a much smaller Tokugawa garrison led by Torii Mototada.

1601–1900
1689 – The Treaty of Nerchinsk is signed by Russia and the Qing Empire (Julian calendar).
1776 – American Revolutionary War: Members of the 1st Maryland Regiment repeatedly charged a numerically superior British force during the Battle of Long Island, allowing General Washington and the rest of the American troops to escape.
1791 – French Revolution: Frederick William II of Prussia and Leopold II, Holy Roman Emperor, issue the Declaration of Pillnitz, declaring the joint support of the Holy Roman Empire and Prussia for the French monarchy, agitating the French revolutionaries and contributing to the outbreak of the War of the First Coalition.
1793 – French Revolutionary Wars: The city of Toulon revolts against the French Republic and admits the British and Spanish fleets to seize its port, leading to the Siege of Toulon by French Revolutionary forces.
1798 – Wolfe Tone's United Irish and French forces clash with the British Army in the Battle of Castlebar, part of the Irish Rebellion of 1798, resulting in the creation of the French puppet Republic of Connacht.
1810 – Napoleonic Wars: The French Navy defeats the British Royal Navy, preventing them from taking the harbour of Grand Port on Île de France.
1813 – French Emperor Napoleon I defeats a larger force of Austrians, Russians, and Prussians at the Battle of Dresden.
1828 – Brazil and Argentina recognize the sovereignty of Uruguay in the Treaty of Montevideo
1832 – Black Hawk, leader of the Sauk tribe of Native Americans, surrenders to U.S. authorities, ending the Black Hawk War.
1859 – Petroleum is discovered in Titusville, Pennsylvania, leading to the world's first commercially successful oil well.
1881 – The Georgia hurricane makes landfall near Savannah, Georgia, resulting in an estimated 700 deaths.
1883 – Eruption of Krakatoa: Four enormous explosions almost completely destroy the island of Krakatoa and cause years of climate change.
1893 – The Sea Islands hurricane strikes the United States near Savannah, Georgia, killing between 1,000 and 2,000 people.
1895 – Japanese invasion of Taiwan: Battle of Baguashan: The Empire of Japan decisively defeats a smaller Formosan army at Changhua, crippling the short-lived Republic of Formosa and leading to its surrender two months later.
1896 – Anglo-Zanzibar War: The shortest war in world history (09:02 to 09:40), between the United Kingdom and Zanzibar.

1901–present
1908 – The Qing dynasty promulgates the Qinding Xianfa Dagang, the first constitutional document in the history of China, transforming the Qing empire into a constitutional monarchy.
1914 – World War I: Battle of Étreux: A British rearguard action by the Royal Munster Fusiliers during the Great Retreat. 
  1914   – World War I: Siege of Tsingtao: A Japanese fleet commanded by Vice Admiral Sadakichi Kato imposes a blockade along the whole coastline of German Tsingtao, initiating the Siege of Tsingtao.
1915 – Attempted assassination of Bishop Patrick Heffron, bishop of the Diocese of Winona, by Rev. Louis M. Lesches.
1916 – World War I: The Kingdom of Romania declares war on Austria-Hungary, entering the war as one of the Allied nations.
1918 – Mexican Revolution: Battle of Ambos Nogales: U.S. Army forces skirmish against Mexican Carrancistas in the only battle of World War I fought on American soil.
1922 – Greco-Turkish War: The Turkish army takes the Aegean city of Afyonkarahisar from the Kingdom of Greece.
1927 – Five Canadian women file a petition to the Supreme Court of Canada, asking: "Does the word 'Persons' in Section 24 of the British North America Act, 1867, include female persons?"
1928 – The Kellogg–Briand Pact outlawing war is signed by fifteen nations. Ultimately sixty-one nations will sign it.
1933 – The first Afrikaans Bible is introduced during a Bible Festival in Bloemfontein.
1939 – First flight of the turbojet-powered Heinkel He 178, the world's first jet aircraft.
1942 – First day of the Sarny Massacre, perpetrated by Germans and Ukrainians.
1943 – World War II: Japanese forces evacuate New Georgia Island in the Pacific Theater of Operations during World War II.
  1943   – World War II: Aerial bombardment by the Luftwaffe razes to the ground the village of Vorizia in Crete.
1955 – The first edition of the Guinness Book of Records is published in Great Britain.
1956 – The nuclear power station at Calder Hall in the United Kingdom was connected to the national power grid becoming the world's first commercial nuclear power station to generate electricity on an industrial scale.
1962 – The Mariner 2 unmanned space mission is launched to Venus by NASA.
1963 – An explosion at the Cane Creek potash mine near Moab, Utah kills 18 miners.
1964 – South Vietnamese junta leader Nguyễn Khánh enters into a triumvirate power-sharing arrangement with rival generals Trần Thiện Khiêm and Dương Văn Minh, who had both been involved in plots to unseat Khánh.
1971 – An attempted coup d'état fails in the African nation of Chad. The Government of Chad accuses Egypt of playing a role in the attempt and breaks off diplomatic relations.
1975 – The Governor of Portuguese Timor abandons its capital, Dili, and flees to Atauro Island, leaving control to a rebel group.
1979 – The Troubles: Eighteen British soldiers are killed in an ambush by the Provisional Irish Republican Army near Warrenpoint, Northern Ireland, in the deadliest attack on British forces during Operation Banner. An IRA bomb also kills British royal family member Lord Mountbatten and three others on his boat at Mullaghmore, Republic of Ireland.
1980 – 1980 South Korean presidential election: After successfully staging the Coup d'état of May Seventeenth, General Chun Doo-hwan, running unopposed, has the National Conference for Unification elect him President of the Fourth Republic of Korea.
  1980   – A massive bomb planted by extortionist John Birges explodes at Harvey's Resort Hotel in Stateline, Nevada, after a failed disarming attempt by the FBI. Although the hotel is damaged, no one is injured. 
1982 – Turkish military diplomat Colonel Atilla Altıkat is shot and killed in Ottawa. Justice Commandos of the Armenian Genocide claim to be avenging the massacre of 1 million Armenians in the 1915 Armenian genocide.
1985 – Major General Muhammadu Buhari, Chairman of the Supreme Military Council of Nigeria, is ousted from power in a coup d'état led by Major General Ibrahim Babangida.
1991 – The European Community recognizes the independence of the Baltic states of Estonia, Latvia and Lithuania.
  1991   – Moldova declares independence from the USSR.
2003 – Mars makes its closest approach to Earth in nearly 60,000 years, passing  distant.
  2003   – The first six-party talks, involving South and North Korea, the United States, China, Japan and Russia, convene to find a peaceful resolution to the security concerns of the North Korean nuclear weapons program.
2006 – Comair Flight 5191 crashes on takeoff from Blue Grass Airport in Lexington, Kentucky, bound for Hartsfield–Jackson Atlanta International Airport in Atlanta. Of the passengers and crew, 49 of 50 are confirmed dead in the hours following the crash.
2009 – Internal conflict in Myanmar: The Burmese military junta and ethnic armies begin three days of violent clashes in the Kokang Special Region.
2011 – Hurricane Irene strikes the United States east coast, killing 47 and causing an estimated $15.6 billion in damage.

Births

Pre-1600
 865 – Rhazes, Persian polymath (d. 925)
1407 – Ashikaga Yoshikazu, Japanese shōgun (d. 1425)
1471 – George, Duke of Saxony (d. 1539)
1487 – Anna of Brandenburg (d. 1514)
1512 – Friedrich Staphylus, German theologian (d. 1564)
1542 – John Frederick, Duke of Pomerania and Protestant Bishop of Cammin (d. 1600)
1545 – Alexander Farnese, Duke of Parma (d. 1592)

1601–1900
1624 – Koxinga, Chinese-Japanese Ming loyalist (d. 1662)
1637 – Charles Calvert, 3rd Baron Baltimore, English politician, 2nd Proprietor of Maryland (d. 1715)
1665 – John Hervey, 1st Earl of Bristol, English politician (d. 1751)
1669 – Anne Marie d'Orléans, queen of Sardinia (d. 1728)
1677 – Otto Ferdinand von Abensberg und Traun, Austrian general (d. 1748)
1724 – John Joachim Zubly, Swiss-American pastor, planter, and politician (d. 1781)
1730 – Johann Georg Hamann, German philosopher and author (d. 1788)
1770 – Georg Wilhelm Friedrich Hegel, German philosopher and academic (d. 1831)
1785 – Agustín Gamarra, Peruvian general and politician, 10th and 14th President of Peru (d. 1841)
1795 – Giorgio Mitrovich, Maltese politician (d. 1885)
1803 – Edward Beecher, American minister and theologian (d. 1895)
1809 – Hannibal Hamlin, American publisher and politician, 15th Vice President of the United States (d. 1891)
1812 – Bertalan Szemere, Hungarian poet and politician, 3rd Prime Minister of Hungary (d. 1869)
1822 – William Hayden English, American politician, U.S. Representative from Indiana and Democratic Vice-Presidential nominee (d. 1896)
1827 – Charles Lilley, English-Australian politician, 4th Premier of Queensland (d. 1897)
1845 – Ödön Lechner, Hungarian architect, designed the Museum of Applied Arts and the Church of St Elisabeth (d. 1914)
  1845   – Friedrich Martens, Estonian-Russian historian, lawyer, and diplomat (d. 1909)
1856 – Ivan Franko, Ukrainian author and poet (d. 1916)
1858 – Giuseppe Peano, Italian mathematician and philosopher (d. 1932)
1864 – Hermann Weingärtner, German gymnast (d. 1919)
1865 – James Henry Breasted, American archaeologist and historian (d. 1935)
  1865   – Charles G. Dawes, American general and politician, 30th Vice President of the United States, Nobel Prize laureate (d. 1951)
1868 – Hong Beom-do, Korean general and activist (d. 1943)
1870 – Amado Nervo, Mexican journalist, poet, and diplomat (d. 1919)
1871 – Theodore Dreiser, American novelist and journalist (d. 1945)
1874 – Carl Bosch, German chemist and engineer, Nobel Prize laureate (d. 1940)
1875 – Katharine McCormick, American biologist, philanthropist, and activist (d. 1967)
1877 – Charles Rolls, English engineer and businessman, co-founded Rolls-Royce Limited (d. 1910)
  1877   – Ernst Wetter, Swiss lawyer and politician, 48th President of the Swiss Confederation (d. 1963)
1878 – Pyotr Nikolayevich Wrangel, Russian general (d. 1928)
1884 – Vincent Auriol, French lawyer and politician, President of the French Republic (d. 1966)
  1884   – Denis G. Lillie, British biologist, member of the 1910–1913 Terra Nova Expedition (d. 1963)
1886 – Rebecca Clarke, English viola player and composer (d. 1979)
1890 – Man Ray, American-French photographer and painter (d. 1976)
1895 – Andreas Alföldi, Hungarian archaeologist and historian (d. 1981)
1896 – Kenji Miyazawa, Japanese author and poet (d. 1933)
1898 – Gaspard Fauteux, Canadian businessman and politician, 19th Lieutenant Governor of Quebec (d. 1963)
1899 – C. S. Forester, English novelist (d. 1966)

1901–present
1904 – Alar Kotli, Estonian architect (d. 1963)
  1904   – Norah Lofts, English author (d. 1983)
  1904   – John Hay Whitney, American businessman, publisher, and diplomat, founded J.H. Whitney & Company (d. 1982)
1905 – Aris Velouchiotis, Greek soldier (d. 1945)
1906 – Ed Gein, American murderer and body snatcher, The Butcher of Plainfield (d. 1982)
1908 – Don Bradman, Australian cricketer and manager (d. 2001)
  1908   – Lyndon B. Johnson, American commander and politician, 36th President of the United States (d. 1973)
1909 – Sylvère Maes, Belgian cyclist (d. 1966)
  1909   – Charles Pozzi, French race car driver (d. 2001)
  1909   – Lester Young, American saxophonist and clarinet player (d. 1959)
1911 – Kay Walsh, English actress and dancer (d. 2005)
1912 – Gloria Guinness, Mexican journalist (d. 1980)
1915 – Norman Foster Ramsey Jr., American physicist and academic, Nobel Prize laureate (d. 2011)
1916 – Gordon Bashford, English engineer, co-designed the Range Rover (d. 1991)
  1916   – Tony Harris, South African cricketer and rugby player (d. 1993)
  1916   – Martha Raye, American actress and comedian (d. 1994)
1917 – Peanuts Lowrey, American baseball player, coach, and manager (d. 1986)
1918 – Jelle Zijlstra, Dutch economist and politician, Prime Minister of the Netherlands (d. 2001)
1919 – Pee Wee Butts, American baseball player and coach (d. 1972)
  1919   – Murray Grand, American singer-songwriter and pianist (d. 2007)
1920 – Baptiste Manzini, American football player (d. 2008)
  1920   – James Molyneaux, Baron Molyneaux of Killead, Northern Irish soldier and politician (d. 2015)
1921 – Georg Alexander, Duke of Mecklenburg (d. 1996)
  1921   – Leo Penn, American actor, director, and screenwriter (d. 1998)
1922 – Roelof Kruisinga, Dutch physician and politician, Minister of Defence for The Netherlands (d. 2012)
1923 – Jimmy Greenhalgh, English footballer and manager (d. 2013)
1924 – David Rowbotham, Australian journalist and poet (d. 2010)
  1924   – Rosalie E. Wahl, American lawyer and jurist (d. 2013)
1925 – Andrea Cordero Lanza di Montezemolo, Italian cardinal (d. 2017)
  1925   – Nat Lofthouse, English footballer and manager (d. 2011)
  1925   – Saiichi Maruya, Japanese author and critic (d. 2012)
  1925   – Bill Neilson, Australian politician, 34th Premier of Tasmania (d. 1989)
  1925   – Jaswant Singh Neki, Indian poet and academic (d. 2015)
  1925   – Carter Stanley, American bluegrass singer-songwriter and guitarist (d. 1966)
1926 – George Brecht, American-German chemist and composer (d. 2008)
  1926   – Kristen Nygaard, Norwegian computer scientist and academic (d. 2002)
1928 – Péter Boross, Hungarian lawyer and politician, 54th Prime Minister of Hungary 
  1928   – Mangosuthu Buthelezi, South African politician, Chief Minister of KwaZulu
  1928   – Joan Kroc, American philanthropist (d. 2003)
1929 – Ira Levin, American novelist, playwright, and songwriter (d. 2007)
  1929   – George Scott, Canadian-American wrestler and promoter (d. 2014)
1930 – Gholamreza Takhti, Iranian wrestler and politician (d. 1968)
1931 – Sri Chinmoy, Indian-American guru and poet (d. 2007)
  1931   – Joe Cunningham, American baseball player and coach (d. 2021)
1932 – Cor Brom, Dutch footballer and manager (d. 2008)
  1932   – Antonia Fraser, English historian and author
1935 – Ernie Broglio, American baseball player (d. 2019)
  1935   – Michael Holroyd, English author
  1935   – Frank Yablans, American screenwriter and producer (d. 2014)
1936 – Joel Kovel, American scholar and author (d. 2018)
  1936   – Lien Chan, Taiwanese politician,  Vice President of the Republic of China 
1937 – Alice Coltrane, American pianist and composer (d. 2007)
  1937   – Tommy Sands, American pop singer and actor
1939 – William Least Heat-Moon, American travel writer and historian 
  1939   – Edward Patten, American singer-songwriter and producer (d. 2005)
1939 – Nikola Pilić, Yugoslav tennis player and coach
1940 – Fernest Arceneaux, American singer and accordion player (d. 2008)
  1940   – Sonny Sharrock, American guitarist (d. 1994)
1941 – Cesária Évora, Cape Verdean singer (d. 2011)
  1941   – János Konrád, Hungarian water polo player and swimmer (d. 2014)
  1941   – Harrison Page, American actor
1942 – Daryl Dragon, American keyboard player and songwriter (d. 2019)
  1942   – Brian Peckford, Canadian educator and politician, 3rd Premier of Newfoundland and Labrador
1943 – Chuck Girard, American singer-songwriter and pianist 
  1943   – Bob Kerrey, American lieutenant and politician, Medal of Honor recipient, 35th Governor of Nebraska
  1943   – Tuesday Weld, American model and actress 
1944 – Tim Bogert, American singer and bass player (d. 2021)  
1945 – Douglas R. Campbell, Canadian lawyer and judge
1946 – Tony Howard, Barbadian cricketer and manager
  1947   – Halil Berktay, Turkish historian and academic
  1947   – Kirk Francis, American engineer and producer
  1947   – Peter Krieg, German director, producer, and screenwriter (d. 2009)
  1947   – John Morrison, New Zealand cricketer and politician
  1947   – Gavin Pfuhl, South African cricketer and sportscaster (d. 2002)
1948 – John Mehler, American drummer 
  1948   – Deborah Swallow, English historian and curator
  1948   – Philippe Vallois, French director and screenwriter
1949 – Jeff Cook, American singer-songwriter and guitarist 
  1949   – Leah Jamieson, American computer scientist, engineer, and academic
  1949   – Ann Murray, Irish soprano
1950 – Charles Fleischer, American comedian and actor 
  1950   – Neil Murray, Scottish bass player and songwriter
  1950   – Edmund Weiner, English lexicographer and author
1951 – Buddy Bell, American baseball player and manager
  1951   – Mack Brown, American football player and coach
  1951   – Randall Garrison, American-Canadian criminologist and politician
1952 – Paul Reubens, American actor and comedian
1953 – Tom Berryhill, American businessman and politician (d. 2020)
  1953   – Alex Lifeson, Canadian singer-songwriter, guitarist, and producer 
  1953   – Joan Smith, English journalist and author
  1953   – Peter Stormare, Swedish actor, director, and playwright 
1954 – John Lloyd, English tennis player and sportscaster
  1954   – Rajesh Thakker, English physician and academic
  1954   – Derek Warwick, English race car driver
1955 – Robert Richardson, American cinematographer
  1955   – Diana Scarwid, American actress
1956 – Glen Matlock, English singer-songwriter and bass player 
1957 – Jeff Grubb, American game designer and author
  1957   – Bernhard Langer, German golfer
1958 – Sergei Krikalev, Russian engineer and astronaut 
  1958   – Tom Lanoye, Belgian author, poet, and playwright
  1958   – Hugh Orde, British police officer
1959 – Daniela Romo, Mexican singer, actress and TV hostess
  1959   – Gerhard Berger, Austrian race car driver
  1959   – Juan Fernando Cobo, Colombian painter and sculptor 
  1959   – Denice Denton, American engineer and academic (d. 2006)
  1959   – Frode Fjellheim, Norwegian pianist and composer
  1959   – András Petőcz, Hungarian author and poet
  1959   – Jeanette Winterson, English journalist and novelist
1961 – Yolanda Adams, American singer, producer, and actress
  1961   – Mark Curry, English television host and actor
  1961   – Tom Ford, American fashion designer
  1961   – Steve McDowall, New Zealand rugby player
  1961   – Helmut Winklhofer, German footballer
1964 – Stephan Elliott, Australian actor, director, and screenwriter
  1964   – Paul Bernardo, Canadian serial rapist and murderer
1965 – Scott Dibble, American lawyer and politician
  1965   – Wayne James, Zimbabwean cricketer and coach
  1965   – Ange Postecoglou, Greek-Australian footballer and coach
1966 – Jeroen Duyster, Dutch rower
  1966   – René Higuita, Colombian footballer 
  1966   – Juhan Parts, Estonian lawyer and politician, 14th Prime Minister of Estonia
1967 – Ogie Alcasid, Filipino singer-songwriter, producer, and actor
  1967   – Rob Burnett, American football player and sportscaster
1968 – Daphne Koller, Israeli-American computer scientist and academic
  1968   – Michael Long, New Zealand golfer
  1968   – Matthew Ridge, New Zealand rugby player and sportscaster
1969 – Mark Ealham, English cricketer
  1969   – Cesar Millan, Mexican-American dog trainer, television personality, and author
  1969   – Reece Shearsmith, English actor, comedian and writer
  1969   – Chandra Wilson, American actress and director
1970 – Andy Bichel, Australian cricketer and coach
  1970   – Mark Ilott, English cricketer
  1970   – Tony Kanal, British-American bass player. songwriter, and record producer
  1970   – Jim Thome, American baseball player and manager
  1970   – Karl Unterkircher, Italian mountaineer (d. 2008)
1971 – Ernest Faber, Dutch footballer and manager
  1971   – Kyung Lah, South Korean-American journalist
  1971   – Hisayuki Okawa, Japanese runner
  1971   – Aygül Özkan, German lawyer and politician
1972 – Jaap-Derk Buma, Dutch field hockey player
  1972   – Denise Lewis, English heptathlete
  1972   – Jimmy Pop, American singer-songwriter and guitarist 
  1972   – The Great Khali, Indian professional wrestler
1973 – Danny Coyne, Welsh footballer
  1973   – Dietmar Hamann, German footballer and manager
  1973   – Burak Kut, Turkish singer-songwriter
  1973   – Johan Norberg, Swedish historian and author
1974 – Michael Mason, New Zealand cricketer
  1974   – José Vidro, Puerto Rican-American baseball player
  1974   – Mohammad Yousuf, Pakistani cricketer
1975 – Blake Adams, American golfer
  1975   – Mase, American rapper, songwriter and pastor
  1975   – Jonny Moseley, Puerto Rican-American skier and television host
  1975   – Mark Rudan, Australian footballer and manager
1976 – Sarah Chalke, Canadian actress
  1976   – Audrey C. Delsanti, French astronomer and biologist
  1976   – Milano Collection A.T., Japanese wrestler
  1976   – Carlos Moyá, Spanish-Swiss tennis player
  1976   – Mark Webber, Australian race car driver
1977 – Deco, Brazilian-Portuguese footballer  
  1977   – Justin Miller, American baseball player (d. 2013)
1979 – Sarah Neufeld, Canadian violinist 
  1979   – Aaron Paul, American actor and producer
  1979   – Karel Rachůnek, Czech ice hockey player (d. 2011)
  1979   – Rusty Smith, American speed skater 
1981 – Maxwell Cabelino Andrade, Brazilian footballer
  1981   – Alessandro Gamberini, Italian footballer
1983 – Joanna McGilchrist, English rugby player and physiotherapist
1984 – David Bentley, English footballer
  1984   – Sulley Muntari, Ghanaian footballer
1985 – Kevan Hurst, English footballer
  1985   – Nikica Jelavić, Croatian footballer
  1985   – Alexandra Nechita, Romanian-American painter and sculptor
1986 – Lana Bastašić, Serbian-Bosnian author and translator
  1986   – Sebastian Kurz, Austrian politician, 25th Chancellor of Austria
1987 – Joel Grant, English-Jamaican footballer
  1987   – Darren McFadden, American football player
1989 – Romain Amalfitano, French footballer
  1989   – Juliana Cannarozzo, American figure skater and actress
1990 – Tori Bowie, American athlete
  1990   – Luuk de Jong, Dutch footballer
1991 – Lee Sung-yeol, South Korean actor and singer 
1992 – Blake Jenner, American actor and singer
  1992   – Stephen Morris, American football player
  1992   – Kim Petras, German singer-songwriter
  1992   – Ayame Goriki, Japanese actress and singer
1993 – Sarah Hecken, German figure skater
  1993   – Olivier Le Gac, French cyclist
1995 – Sergey Sirotkin, Russian race car driver
1998 – Kevin Huerter, American basketball player

Deaths

Pre-1600
 542 – Caesarius of Arles, French bishop and saint (b. 470)
 749 – Qahtaba ibn Shabib al-Ta'i, Persian general
 827 – Pope Eugene II
 923 – Ageltrude, queen of Italy and Holy Roman Empress 
1146 – King Eric III of Denmark
1255 – Little Saint Hugh of Lincoln (b. 1247)
1312 – Arthur II, Duke of Brittany (b. 1261)
1394 – Emperor Chōkei of Japan (b. 1343)
1450 – Reginald West, 6th Baron De La Warr, English politician (b. 1395)
1521 – Josquin des Prez, Flemish composer (b. 1450)
1545 – Piotr Gamrat, Polish archbishop (b. 1487)
1576 – Titian, Italian painter and educator (b. 1488)
1590 – Pope Sixtus V (b. 1521)

1601–1900
1611 – Tomás Luis de Victoria, Spanish composer (b. c. 1548)
1635 – Lope de Vega, Spanish poet and playwright (b. 1562)
1664 – Francisco de Zurbarán, Spanish painter and educator (b. 1598)
1748 – James Thomson, Scottish poet and playwright (b. 1700)
1782 – John Laurens, American Revolutionary and abolitionist (b.1754)
1828 – Eise Eisinga, Dutch astronomer and academic, built the Eisinga Planetarium (b. 1744)
1857 – Rufus Wilmot Griswold, American anthologist, poet, and critic (b. 1815)
1865 – Thomas Chandler Haliburton, Canadian judge and politician (b. 1796)
1871 – William Whiting Boardman, American lawyer and politician (b. 1794)
1875 – William Chapman Ralston, American businessman and financier, founded the Bank of California (b. 1826)
1891 – Samuel C. Pomeroy, American businessman and politician (b. 1816)

1901–present
1903 – Kusumoto Ine, first Japanese female doctor of Western medicine (b. 1827)
1909 – Emil Christian Hansen, Danish physiologist and mycologist (b. 1842)
1922 – Reşat Çiğiltepe, Turkish colonel (b. 1879)
1929 – Herman Potočnik, Croatian-Austrian engineer (b. 1892)
1931 – Frank Harris, Irish-American journalist and author (b. 1856)
  1931   – Willem Hubert Nolens, Dutch priest and politician (b. 1860)
  1931   – Francis Marion Smith, American miner and businessman (b. 1846)
1935 – Childe Hassam, American painter and academic (b. 1859)
1944 – Georg von Boeselager, German soldier (b. 1915)
1945 – Hubert Pál Álgyay, Hungarian engineer, designed the Petőfi Bridge (b. 1894)
1948 – Charles Evans Hughes, American lawyer and politician, 11th Chief Justice of the United States (b. 1862)
1950 – Cesare Pavese,  Italian author, poet, and critic (b. 1908)
1956 – Pelageya Shajn, Russian astronomer and academic (b. 1894)
1958 – Ernest Lawrence, American physicist and academic, Nobel Prize laureate (b. 1901)
1963 – W. E. B. Du Bois, American sociologist, historian, and activist (b. 1868)
  1963   – Inayatullah Khan Mashriqi, Pakistani mathematician and scholar (b. 1888)
1964 – Gracie Allen, American actress and comedian (b. 1895)
1965 – Le Corbusier, Swiss-French architect and urban planner, designed the Philips Pavilion (b. 1887)
1967 – Brian Epstein, English businessman and manager (b. 1934)
1968 – Princess Marina of Greece and Denmark (b. 1906)
1969 – Ivy Compton-Burnett, English author (b. 1884)
  1969   – Erika Mann, German actress and author (b. 1905)
1971 – Bennett Cerf, American publisher, co-founded Random House (b. 1898)
  1971   – Margaret Bourke-White, American photographer and journalist  (b. 1906)
1975 – Haile Selassie, Ethiopian emperor (b. 1892)
1978 – Gordon Matta-Clark, American painter and illustrator (b. 1943)
  1978   – Ieva Simonaitytė, Lithuanian author and poet (b. 1897)
1979 – Louis Mountbatten, 1st Earl Mountbatten of Burma, English admiral and politician, 44th Governor-General of India (b. 1900)
1980 – Douglas Kenney, American actor, producer, and screenwriter (b. 1947)
1981 – Valeri Kharlamov, Russian ice hockey player (b. 1948)
1990 – Avdy Andresson, Estonian soldier and diplomat (b. 1899)
  1990   – Stevie Ray Vaughan, American singer-songwriter, guitarist, and producer (b. 1954)
1992 – Bengt Holbek, Danish folklorist (b. 1933)
1994 – Frank Jeske, German footballer (b. 1960)
1996 – Greg Morris, American actor (b. 1933)
1998 – Essie Summers, New Zealand author (b. 1912)
1999 – Hélder Câmara, Brazilian archbishop and theologian (b. 1909)
2001 – Michael Dertouzos, Greek-American computer scientist and academic (b. 1936)
  2001   – Abu Ali Mustafa, Palestinian politician (b. 1938)
2002 – Edwin Louis Cole, American religious leader and author (b. 1922)
2003 – Pierre Poujade, French soldier and politician (b. 1920)
2004 – Willie Crawford, American baseball player (b. 1946)
2005 – Giorgos Mouzakis, Greek trumpet player and composer (b. 1922)
  2005   – Seán Purcell, Irish footballer (b. 1929)
2006 – Hrishikesh Mukherjee, Indian director, producer, and screenwriter (b. 1922)
  2006   – Jesse Pintado, Mexican-American guitarist (b. 1969)
2007 – Emma Penella, Spanish actress (b. 1930)
2009 – Sergey Mikhalkov, Russian author and poet (b. 1913)
2010 – Anton Geesink, Dutch martial artist (b. 1934)
  2010   – Luna Vachon, Canadian-American wrestler and manager (b. 1962)
2012 – Neville Alexander, South African linguist and activist (b. 1936)
  2012   – Malcolm Browne, American journalist and photographer (b. 1931)
  2012   – Art Heyman, American basketball player (b. 1941)
  2012   – Ivica Horvat, Croatian footballer and manager (b. 1926)
  2012   – Richard Kingsland, Australian captain and pilot (b. 1916)
2013 – Chen Liting, Chinese director and playwright (b. 1910)
  2013   – Bill Peach, Australian journalist (b. 1935)
  2013   – Dave Thomas, Welsh golfer and architect (b. 1934)
2014 – Jacques Friedel, French physicist and academic (b. 1921)
  2014   – Valeri Petrov, Bulgarian poet, playwright, and screenwriter (b. 1920)
  2014   – Benno Pludra, German author (b. 1925)
2015 – Kazi Zafar Ahmed, Bangladeshi politician, 8th Prime Minister of Bangladesh (b. 1939)
  2015   – Pascal Chaumeil, French director and screenwriter (b. 1961)
  2015   – Darryl Dawkins, American basketball player and coach (b. 1957)

Holidays and observances
Christian feast day:
Baculus of Sorrento
Caesarius of Arles
Decuman
Gebhard of Constance
Euthalia
John of Pavia
Lycerius (or: Glycerius, Lizier)
Máel Ruba (or Rufus) (Scotland)
Margaret the Barefooted
Monica of Hippo, mother of Augustine of Hippo
Narnus
Our Lady of La Vang
Phanourios of Rhodes
Rufus and Carpophorus
Syagrius of Autun
Thomas Gallaudet and Henry Winter Syle (Episcopal Church)
August 27 (Eastern Orthodox liturgics)
Film and Movies Day (Russia)
Independence Day (Republic of Moldova), celebrates the independence of Moldova from the USSR in 1991.
Lyndon Baines Johnson Day (Texas, United States)
National Banana Lovers Day (United States)
National Pots De Creme Day (United States)

References

External links

 
 
 

Days of the year
August